Schmilka-Hirschmühle station is a railway station on the Děčín–Dresden-Neustadt railway for the village of Schmilka, Saxony, Germany. The station is located across the Elbe river and can be reached from Schmilka by ferry. They station lies in the Reinhardtsdorf-Schöna municipality.

The station is served by the Dresden S-Bahn S1 service from Meißen, Dresden, Heidenau, Pirna to Schöna. There is also a Regionalbahn (National Park Railway) service every 2 hours from Děčín to Rumburk via Bad Schandau and Sebnitz.

References

External links
Schmilka-Hirschmühle station at www.verkehrsmittelvergleich.de 

Railway stations in Saxony
Reinhardtsdorf-Schöna
Dresden S-Bahn stations